Laxta granicollis, the bark cockroach,  is a species of Blaberidae that occurs in Australia. The female of this species lacks wings while the male is winged.

References

Cockroaches
Insects of Australia
Insects described in 1862